Anatoly Tyurin (born July 1, 1968, in Vologda, Russian SFSR) is an Uzbek sprint canoer who competed in the early to mid-1990s. Competing for the Unified Team, he was eliminated in the semifinals of the K-2 1000 m event at the 1992 Summer Olympics in Barcelona. Four years later in Atlanta, Kireyev was eliminated in the semifinals of the K-4 1000 m event while competing for Uzbekistan.

External links
 Sports-Reference.com profile

1968 births
Canoeists at the 1992 Summer Olympics
Canoeists at the 1996 Summer Olympics
Living people
Olympic canoeists of the Unified Team
Olympic canoeists of Uzbekistan
Soviet male canoeists
Uzbekistani male canoeists
Russian male canoeists
Asian Games medalists in canoeing
Canoeists at the 1994 Asian Games
Medalists at the 1994 Asian Games
Asian Games gold medalists for Uzbekistan
Asian Games silver medalists for Uzbekistan